Sumrai Tete (born 15 November 1979) is a member of the India women's national field hockey team. She played with the team when it won the Gold at the Manchester 2002 Commonwealth Games.

In the year 2017, she was honoured with the prestigious Dhyan Chand Award by the Ministry of Youth Affairs and Sports for her achievements and contribution to Field hockey in India.

She is the brand ambassador of Hockey in her state Jharkhand. The Chief Minister Raghubar Das also announced that she will be training the State level hockey players.

References

External links
Biography
Commonwealth Games Biography

1979 births
People from Simdega district
Field hockey players from Jharkhand
Indian female field hockey players
Field hockey players at the 2002 Commonwealth Games
Field hockey players at the 2006 Commonwealth Games
Commonwealth Games gold medallists for India
Commonwealth Games silver medallists for India
Living people
Field hockey players at the 2002 Asian Games
Sportswomen from Jharkhand
Commonwealth Games medallists in field hockey
21st-century Indian women
21st-century Indian people
Asian Games competitors for India
Recipients of the Dhyan Chand Award
Medallists at the 2002 Commonwealth Games
Medallists at the 2006 Commonwealth Games